Willie Whitehead, Jr. (born January 26, 1973) is a former professional American and Canadian football defensive end who played for the New Orleans Saints of the National Football League (NFL). He walked-on to play college football with Auburn before winning a scholarship. He graduated with a Communications degree in 1994, garnering 65 tackles and five sacks his senior season.

Professional career
Whitehead began his pro career signing as an undrafted free agent with the San Francisco 49ers for the 1995 season. After being cut by the 49ers, he split time between the CFL's Baltimore Stallions active roster and the 49ers practice squad. The following season, he played with the CFL's Montreal Alouettes and then in 1997 he led the Hamilton Tiger-Cats in sacks and added 44 tackles. After his strong showing in the CFL, Whitehead spent the 1998 training camp with the Detroit Lions before having a brief stint with the Frankfurt Galaxy of NFL Europe. In 1999, Whitehead found his place on a permanent NFL roster, earning a starting position with the New Orleans Saints, with whom he has remained for the last eight seasons of his NFL career. He has the second most sacks among current Saints players with 24.5 sacks (the other defensive end Charles Grant leads with 33). On June 15, 2007 the Saints released him.

Personal
Whitehead and his father, Willie Whitehead, Sr. are both members of Phi Beta Sigma fraternity.

Whitehead along with Ira Newble appeared together on an episode of The Real Housewives of Atlanta where they were dates at an auction.

His nephew is football player Tahir Whitehead, who was a defensive end from 2008-2011 for Temple University, and currently plays in the NFL for the Carolina Panthers.

External links
New Orleans Saints Player Bio

References

1973 births
Living people
American football defensive ends
Auburn Tigers football players
Players of American football from Alabama
New Orleans Saints players
Sportspeople from Tuskegee, Alabama
People from Macon County, Alabama
Ed Block Courage Award recipients